In mathematics, the Herglotz–Zagier function, named after Gustav Herglotz and Don Zagier, is the function

introduced by  who used it to obtain a Kronecker limit formula for real quadratic fields.

References

Special functions